is a four-part hentai anime series released in 1994 by Pink Pineapple in Japan. The series focuses on tentacle rape and S&M. It was adapted into a live-action series. The animated series was released in North America by ADV Films under their SoftCel Pictures label. The genre is situated between sci-fi horror and the slasher film.

Plot

The first episode begins during a rainy night in a thunderstorm when Professor Goda is digging under a large tree in the schoolyard. He breaks through a mysterious stone tablet and is attacked by a large tentacled monster and is suddenly infected. Later, millions of students are attending the opening ceremony of the Siren Academy-(a prestigious boarding school for just girls). It's at this point we discover that two young girls - Sayaka and Atsuko, are lesbian lovers that have dated since high school, and are trying to hide their affair from Atsuko's older sister, who is currently playing the organ. We then see Professor Goda, who is also attending the opening ceremonies, looking on the crowd of freshmen with evil intent and a sinister smile. After the ceremony has ended, a group of five girls discover a goblin-looking creature in the background of one of their photos after getting the picture taken; they decide to delete the picture, due to its frightening appearance.

The scene then shifts to an underground basement in the school's church, where Professor Goda and The Director are raping a freshman student who is tied up and gagged.  The Director is dressed up in typical red S&M bondage gear while Goda is buck naked. Goda comments that he needs the extracts of younger women in order to provide food for an organism that he just discovered.  The Director appears to be enjoying watching the torture and involves herself in the process by whipping the freshman with her riding crop until the freshman faint from shock.

The scene cuts to the dormitory where Sayaka and Atsuko are currently engaging in heavy petting and passionate kissing in their dorm room. The scene develops into a full sex scene until they are interrupted at the end of their lovemaking by a group of fellow students knocking at the door asking them to come to dinner.  It's at this point there are clear signs that there is something wrong with the student population as all the girls are listless and uninterested in anything, including Atsuko's "impressions".

Yuko manages to get a little life out of them through her violin playing, but it is clear there is still something wrong.  Professor Goda is in the church listening to the music when he is suddenly attacked by what appears to be a fairy, who we later find out is named Rom. The show then cuts to a montage of Sayaka and Atsuko's life at their new school, and Atsuko proves to be an apt athlete in lacrosse and a healthy eater, and is very popular with the other girls in the school, to the disapproval of Sayaka who wants Atsuko all for herself.

Characters

First story 
 
 

 
 

 
 

 
 

Goda is a young and nice looking science professor at prestigious girls' school who broke a seal on a tree and was attacked and possessed by a tentacle monster.

 Siren Director

Second story

Production
Considered soft porn, Angel of Darkness''' attempts to merge the magical girl anime formula with the tentacle rape hentai genre. This was done in order to circumvent stringent Japanese censorship laws at the time that did not allow the animation of the pubic region and identifiable genitalia. As such, hentai films began using monsters with phallic tentacles to "rape" women in films.

Media

AnimeAngel of Darkness series was licensed by ADV Films and released under their Softcel label.  All four episodes were released on VHS and DVD with subtitles only.

Live-actionAngel of Darkness was adapted into five live-action adult films and were released in English by Critical Mass Video.

Reception

Patrick Drazen regards Angel of Darkness'' as being an example of the use of "horror to express sexual anxiety", and as an example of Gothic fiction.  Chris Beveridge regards the hentai to be "neither the best nor the worst" that he had seen, but enjoyed the third episode over the last, as it was more plot-oriented.

References

External links
Official Pink Pineapple Angel of Darkness website 
SoftCel Pictures page: animated series
Critical Mass Video page: live action series
ASM page (live action): AOD movie 2

1994 anime OVAs
Hentai anime and manga
Horror anime and manga
Pink Pineapple
Rape in fiction
Anime film and television articles using incorrect naming style
Japanese horror films